Introduction to the Enemy is a 1974 American documentary film about Vietnam, filmed and directed by Haskell Wexler. Shot in the spring of 1974 and released before the end of the year, the film examines the human costs of the Vietnam War. The camera follows American actress Jane Fonda and her husband Tom Hayden, already known in their home country for antiwar activism, as they make inquiries regarding the war's effects and legacy among Vietnamese people from all walks of life.

Plot and style
The film presents the experiences of Fonda, Hayden, and their infant son Troy as they traveled throughout Vietnam in the spring of 1974 – after U.S. military involvement had largely ended but before the ultimate end of the war. Their journey goes from the capital city Hanoi in the North through the demilitarized zone down to Quang Tri province in the South. The trip was deemed "a tour in support of the Vietnamese people", and the film was intended to show the universality of human lives among "the enemy" in the Vietnam War.

The film largely avoids dramatic details of war and politics and instead focuses more on the day-to-day lives of average people. Fonda and Hayden visit farmers, doctors, artists, soldiers, trade unionists, and even fellow actors and filmmakers in a Hanoi movie studio. One of the key points that it attempts to express is that the Vietnamese people did not hold American people in contempt as a result of the decade-long Vietnam War, always distinguishing between people and their governments. Fonda described the message of the film as one of peace and unity. She noted that, while American involvement in Vietnam had officially ended in 1973, the film helped to raise much-needed awareness of American culpability and the ongoing struggle of the Vietnamese.

Critics noted its gentle and unhurried style: Nora Sayre described it as a "quiet, moving film", while Molly Haskell praised it as endearingly modest in its approach, "a tiny jewel of a film". Fonda herself calls the film "slow-moving" but intentionally so, mimicking as it does the traditional pace of daily life in Vietnam.

Still, at least one scene breaks the languidity with a shock. An undetected landmine exploded during production, killing a nearby man offscreen as cameras rolled. Wexler captured Fonda's horrified reaction, and this was left in the final cut. She later described the moment as possibly the most powerful in the entire film, remarking with irony: "How many times as an actress I was paid to cry...."

Production and distribution
Introduction to the Enemy  was the first release of Fonda's newly founded production company, the Indochina Peace Campaign (later rebranded as IPC Films). Cinematography was by Wexler with assistance by Pham Viet Tung. Film editing was handled by Christine Burill and Bill Yahraus.

The film was released to select theaters in November 1974. Fonda and Hayden went on an accompanying lecture tour, speaking at screenings throughout the U.S. and beyond. As a commercial release, it was a box office failure, but an expected one. Beyond its limited release, it was frequently donated to antiwar groups and shown free of charge. In interviews, Fonda spoke of the imperative to spread the message of the film.

Reception and legacy
Writing in The New York Times, Nora Sayre called the film "pensive and moving" but others were less admiring. The Times''' own associate editor, Walter Goodman, labeled the film as "Communist propaganda", and complained acidly that it plays upon sentimentality by constantly veering among shots of "beautiful children, bombed-out-towns, beautiful children, workers making bicycles... and beautiful children". An editorial in a Louisiana newspaper called it "an unabashed publicist's job" for the North Vietnamese. The Hollywood trade journal Variety simply dismissed it as an example of the filmmakers' self-dramatization and radical chic (and even scornfully remarked upon Fonda's "incongruously dippy smile").

Molly Haskell wrote a highly positive review, with particular approval for how "Wexler's cinematography beautifully captures the twin landscapes of destruction and rebirth". The film is emblematic of Wexler's personal brand of leftist politics as displayed in his other works, from the 1971 documentary Interviews with My Lai Veterans to the 1978 big-budget drama Coming Home (also starring Fonda). Nonetheless, after his death in 2015, Wexler's obituaries generally gave only minimal descriptions of Introduction, and at least one major newspaper described it simply as "notorious".

From her involvement with the film (and with radical politics in general), Fonda suffered some repercussions, but she defiantly described them only as "a loss of cynicism, and a loss of irrelevance." Her professional career continued to move briskly forward. She starred in the Hollywood-made comedy Fun with Dick & Jane'', a box office success in 1977, and went on to a lengthy body of work. Hayden went on to serve in the California State Assembly and Senate. He and Fonda divorced in 1989.

The film was shown at the 2015 Vienna International Film Festival, and at the Brooklyn Academy of Music (BAM) on March 7, 2016.

References

Bibliography

External links
 

1974 documentary films
American documentary films
Documentary films about the Vietnam War
Films directed by Haskell Wexler
Films set in Vietnam
Films shot in Vietnam
1970s English-language films
1970s American films